Pietro Garlato (10 January 1928 – 29 April 2013) was the Roman Catholic bishop of the Diocese of Tivoli, Italy.

Ordained to the priesthood in 1951, Garlato was named bishop in 1986 and retired in 2003.

Notes

1928 births
2013 deaths
Bishops of Tivoli